Geophilus koreanus is a species of soil centipede in the family Geophilidae
found in North Korea. It's yellow in color and grows up to 30 millimeters long, with 69 leg pairs, a clypeus rather longer than wide, filiform antennae, central part of the labrum with 8 teeth, maxilla completely fused without median suture, tergite bifurcate, final leg tarsus bipartite, and a clawed pratarsus. It's similar to G. strictus, though the latter differs by the middle part of the labrum bearing a large number of very small teeth, and the final hip bearing a large number of pores.

References

koreanus
Animals described in 1936
Arthropods of Korea